In Greek mythology, Tithonus ( or) was the lover of  Eos, Goddess of the Dawn.  He was a prince of Troy, the son of King Laomedon by the Naiad Strymo (Στρυμώ). The mythology reflected by the fifth-century vase-painters of Athens envisaged Tithonus as a rhapsode, as attested by the lyre in his hand, on an oinochoe (wine jug) of the Achilles Painter, circa 470–460 BC.

An asteroid (6998) has been named after Tithonus.

Etymology
Tithonus has been taken by the allegorist to mean ‘a grant of a stretching-out’ (from teinō and ōnė), a reference to the stretching-out of his life, at Eos’s plea; but it is likely, rather, to have been a masculine form of Eos’s own name, Titonë – from titō, ‘day and onë, ‘queen’ – and to have meant ‘partner of the Queen of Day’.

Mythology
Eos is said to have taken Tithonus, from the royal house of Troy, to be her lover. The myth of Eos and Tithonus' love was known to Homer, who wrote that in the morning Eos rose from the bed she shared with Tithonus in order to give her light to mankind.

The mytheme of the goddess' mortal lover is an archaic one; when a role for Zeus was inserted, a bitter twist appeared: according to the Homeric Hymn to Aphrodite, when Eos asked Zeus to make Tithonus immortal, she forgot to ask that he be granted eternal youth. Tithonus indeed lived forever,
but when loathsome old age pressed full upon him, and he could not move nor lift his limbs, this seemed to her in her heart the best counsel: she laid him in a room and put to the shining doors. There he babbles endlessly, and no more has strength at all, such as once he had in his supple limbs.

In later tellings, he eventually became a cicada (tettix),  eternally living, but begging for death to overcome him. In the Olympian system, the "queenly" and "golden-throned" Eos can no longer grant immortality to her lover as Selene had done, but must ask it of Zeus, as a boon. In the account of Hieronymus of Rhodes from the third century BC, the blame is shifted from Eos onto Tithonus, who asked for immortality but not agelessness from his lover, who was then unable to help him otherwise and turned him into a cicada. Propertius wrote that Eos did not forsake Tithonus, old and aged as he was, and would still embrace him and hold him in her arms rather than leaving him deserted in his cold chamber, while cursing the gods for his cruel fate.

This myth might have been used to explain why cicadas were particularly noisy during the early hours of the morning, when the dawn appears in the sky. Sir James George Frazer notes that among ancient Greeks and several other peoples there was a widespread belief that creatures that can shed their skin renew their youth and live forever. It might also be a reference to the fact that the high-pitched talk of old men was compared to the cicadas' singing, as seen in a passage from the Iliad. In fact the ancient Greeks would use a cicada sitting on a harp as an emblem of music.

Eos bore Tithonus two sons, Memnon and Emathion. According to Quintus Smyrnaeus, Memnon was raised by the Hesperides on the coast of Oceanus. According to the historian Diodorus Siculus, Tithonus, who had travelled east from Troy into Assyria and founded Susa, was bribed with a golden grapevine to send his son Memnon to fight at Troy against the Greeks.

The Tithonus poem is one of the few nearly complete works of the Greek lyric poet Sappho, having been pieced together from fragments discovered over a period of more than a hundred years.
 
Eos (as Thesan) and Tithonus (as Tinthu or Tinthun) provided a pictorial motif inscribed or cast in low relief on the backs of Etruscan bronze hand-mirrors.

Modern poems
Tithonus as an aged immortal is mentioned in Book I, Canto II, Stanza VII of Edmund Spenser's The Faerie Queene.
"Tithonus" by Alfred Tennyson was originally written as "Tithon" in 1833 and completed in 1859. The poem is a dramatic monologue in blank verse from the point of view of Tithonus. Unlike the original myth, it is Tithonus who asks for immortality, and it is Aurora, not Zeus, who grants this imperfect gift. As narrator, Tithonus laments his unnatural longevity, which separates him from the mortal world as well as from the immortal but beautiful Aurora.

 "Tithonus" by Paul Muldoon was originally published in The New Yorker and included in the book Horse Latitudes (2006).
 Johann Gottfried Herder: "Tithonus und Aurora"
 "Tithonus" by A.E. Stallings was published in the book Archaic Smile (1999).
 "Tithon" is mentioned in the poem "On Imagination" by Phillis Wheatley.
 Tithonus is also mentioned in a poem by Sappho, the Tithonus poem.
 Tithonus "46 Minutes in the Life of the Dawn" is a performance poem by Alice Oswald from her 2016 anthology Falling Awake
 Tithonus is mentioned in the poem "Departing Light" by Robert Gray from his 2006 book Nameless Earth.
 Tithonus is the subject of a 2019 song by the same name by singer/songwriter Eytan Mirsky and appears on his album If Not Now... Later.
 "Tithonus" is a poem by Derek Mahon, included in his Selected Poems (1990).
 Tithonus is mentioned in When Women were Dragons, by Kelly Barnhill (2022)

See also
 Aurora (goddess)
 Cumaean Sibyl, another mortal who was granted an extended lifetime but not eternal youth
 Tithonus (The X-Files), an episode of the X-Files that is a modern retelling of the story.
 Myia, another mythological insect.

Footnotes

References

Further reading
 Graves, Robert, The Greek Myths: The Complete and Definitive Edition. Penguin Books Limited. 2017. 
Segal, Charles. "Tithonus and the Homeric Hymn to Aphrodite: A Comment." Arethusa 19, no. 1 (1986): 37–47. Accessed May 10, 2020.

External links 

 Sappho's poem
 Tennyson's poem 
 

Trojans
Princes in Greek mythology
Metamorphoses into arthropods in Greek mythology
 
Mythological insects
Immortality
Consorts of Eos